Doc Martin or Doc Martins may refer to one of the following:

Doc Martin, a British television series
Thomas "Doc" Martin, an American physician
Harold Douglas "Doc" Martin, an American football player
Harold Winthrop "Doc" Martin, an American baseball player
Dr. Martens, a shoe brand commonly called "Doc Martens"